The 2019 NCAA Division I baseball tournament was a tournament of 64-teams to determine the National Collegiate Athletic Association (NCAA) Division I national champion for the 2019 season. The 73rd annual edition of the tournament began on May 31, 2019 and concluded with the 2019 College World Series in Omaha, Nebraska, which started on June 15 and ended on June 26.

Summit League champion Omaha made their first appearance in the tournament.

As a result of a worldwide COVID-19 pandemic that started in late 2019 and subsequently forced the cancellation of the remainder of the 2020 season and tournament, this would be the last tournament held until 2021.

Tournament procedure 
A total of 64 teams entered the 2019 tournament. 31 automatic bids were awarded to each program that won their conference's tournament or regular season. The remaining 33 bids were "at-large", with selections extended by the NCAA Selection Committee.

The Selection Committee seeded the national seeds from 1 to 16, each of whom would host their respective regional.

The selections and seedings were completed and revealed on Monday, May 27, 2019, at 12 p.m. EDT on ESPNU.

All qualifying teams were placed into 16 regional double-elimination brackets of four teams. The winners of each regional advanced to a Super Regional in a best-of-three format to advance to the College World Series.

Schedule and venues 
The following are the sites that hosted each round of the tournament:

Regionals
May 31–June 3
Foley Field, Athens, Georgia, (Host: University of Georgia)
Russ Chandler Stadium, Atlanta, Georgia, (Host: Georgia Institute of Technology)
Alex Box Stadium, Baton Rouge, Louisiana, (Host: Louisiana State University)
Boshamer Stadium, Chapel Hill, North Carolina, (Host: University of North Carolina)
Goss Stadium at Coleman Field, Corvallis, Oregon (Host: Oregon State University)
Baum–Walker Stadium, Fayetteville, Arkansas (Host: University of Arkansas)
Lewis Field at Clark-LeClair Stadium, Greenville, North Carolina, (Host: East Carolina University)
Jackie Robinson Stadium, Los Angeles, California (Host: University of California, Los Angeles)
Jim Patterson Stadium, Louisville, Kentucky, (Host: University of Louisville)
Dan Law Field at Rip Griffin Park, Lubbock, Texas, (Host: Texas Tech University)
Monongalia County Ballpark, Morgantown, West Virginia (Host: West Virginia University)
Hawkins Field, Nashville, Tennessee, (Host: Vanderbilt University)
Chickasaw Bricktown Ballpark, Oklahoma City, Oklahoma (Host: Oklahoma State University)
Swayze Field, Oxford, Mississippi, (Host: University of Mississippi)
Klein Field at Sunken Diamond, Stanford, California (Host: Stanford University)
Dudy Noble Field at Polk–Dement Stadium, Starkville, Mississippi, (Host: Mississippi State University)

Super Regionals
June 7–10
Jackie Robinson Stadium, Los Angeles
Dan Law Field at Rip Griffin Park, Lubbock, Texas
Baum–Walker Stadium, Fayetteville, Arkansas
Alex Box Stadium, Baton Rouge, Louisiana
Boshamer Stadium, Chapel Hill, North Carolina
Dudy Noble Field at Polk–Dement Stadium, Starkville, Mississippi
Jim Patterson Stadium, Louisville, Kentucky
Hawkins Field, Nashville, Tennessee

College World Series
June 15–26
TD Ameritrade Park Omaha, Omaha, Nebraska, (Host: Creighton University)

Bids

Automatic bids

At–large

By Conference

National seeds
The sixteen national seeds, which hosted the regionals, were announced on the Selection Show on May 27 at 12 p.m. EDT on ESPNU. Teams in italics advanced to the Super Regionals. Teams in bold advanced to the College World Series.

1. UCLA

2. Vanderbilt

3. 

4. Georgia

5. Arkansas

6. Mississippi State

7. Louisville

8. Texas Tech

9.  

10. 

11. Stanford

12. Ole Miss

13. LSU

14. North Carolina

15. 

16. Oregon State

Regionals and Super Regionals
Bold indicates winner. Seeds for regional tournaments indicate seeds within regional.  Seeds for super regional tournaments indicate national seeds only.

Los Angeles Super Regional

Lubbock Super Regional

†Due to flooding in the Stillwater area, including their home field Allie P. Reynolds Stadium, Oklahoma State hosted their regional at Chickasaw Bricktown Ballpark in Oklahoma City.

Fayetteville Super Regional

Baton Rouge Super Regional

Chapel Hill Super Regional

Starkville Super Regional

Louisville Super Regional

Nashville Super Regional

College World Series
The College World Series was held at TD Ameritrade Park Omaha in Omaha, Nebraska.

Participants

Bracket
Seeds listed below indicate national seeds only

Game results

All-Tournament Team
The following players were members of the College World Series All-Tournament Team.

Final standings
Seeds listed below indicate national seeds only

Record by conference

The columns RF, SR, WS, NS, CS, and NC respectively stand for the Regional Finals, Super Regionals, College World Series Teams, National Semifinals, Championship Series, and National Champion.

Nc is non–conference records, i.e., with the records of teams within the same conference having played each other removed.

Media coverage

Radio
NRG Media provided nationwide radio coverage of the College World Series through its Omaha Station KOZN, in association with Westwood One. It also streamed all CWS games at westwoodonesports.com on Tunein and on SiriusXM. Kevin Kugler and John Bishop called games leading up to the Championship Series with Gary Sharp acting as the field reporter. The Championship Series was called by Kugler and Scott Graham with Bishop acting as the field reporter.

Kugler lost his voice after the games on June 16, so Jeff Leise (afternoon) and Damon Benning (evening) joined Bishop and Sharp on Westwood One for the games on June 17, 18, and 19 before Kugler returned on the night of the 19.

Television
ESPN carried every game from the Regionals, Super Regionals, and the College World Series across its networks. During the Regionals and Super Regionals, ESPN offered a dedicated channel, ESPN Bases Loaded (carried in the same channel allotments as its "Goal Line" services for football), which carried live look-ins and analyses across the games in progress.

Broadcast assignments

Regionals

Tom Hart and Kyle Peterson: Athens, Georgia
Steve Lenox and Rusty Ensor: Atlanta, Georgia
Mike Morgan and Ben McDonald: Baton Rouge, Louisiana
Kevin Brown and JP Arencibia: Chapel Hill, North Carolina
Rich Waltz and Kevin Stocker: Corvallis, Oregon
Jim Barbar  and Scott Pose: Fayetteville, Arkansas
Jon Meterparel and Troy Eklund: Greenville, North Carolina
Roxy Bernstein and Wes Clements: Los Angeles, California

Clay Matvick and Chris Burke: Louisville, Kentucky
Mike Couzens and Greg Swindell: Lubbock, Texas
Mark Neely and Mike LaValliere: Morgantown, West Virginia
Dave Neal and Todd Walker: Nashville, Tennessee
Richard Cross and Lance Cormier: Oxford, Mississippi
Lowell Galindo and Keith Moreland: Oklahoma City, Oklahoma
Roy Philpott and Nick Belmonte: Starkville, Mississippi
Sam Ravech and JT Snow: Stanford, California

Super Regionals

Tom Hart, Eduardo Pérez, and Kyle Peterson: Baton Rouge, Louisiana
Mike Morgan and Greg Swindell: Chapel Hill, North Carolina
Clay Matvick and Todd Walker: Fayetteville, Arkansas
Roxy Bernstein and Wes Clements: Los Angeles, California

Richard Cross and Lance Cormier: Louisville, Kentucky
Lowell Galindo and Keith Moreland: Lubbock, Texas
Rich Waltz and Mike Rooney: Nashville, Tennessee
Dave Neal, Chris Burke, and Ben McDonald: Starkville, Mississippi

College World Series

Tom Hart, Chris Burke, Ben McDonald, and Mike Rooney: Afternoons, Thursday night

Karl Ravech, Eduardo Pérez, Kyle Peterson, and Kris Budden: Evenings minus Thursday

CWS Championship Series

Karl Ravech, Eduardo Pérez, Kyle Peterson, and Kris Budden

References

NCAA Division I Baseball Championship
tournament
NCAA
NCAA
NCAA
NCAA
NCAA
NCAA
NCAA
NCAA
NCAA
NCAA
NCAA
NCAA
NCAA